Dirk de Waard (5 February 1919 – 26 January 2011) was a Dutch-born American geologist. He was a professor of geology at Syracuse University.

De Waard was born in Hilversum. He was elected a correspondent of the Royal Netherlands Academy of Arts and Sciences in 1955. De Waard died in Montgomery, Texas in January 2011 at the age of 91.

References

1919 births
2011 deaths
Members of the Royal Netherlands Academy of Arts and Sciences
People from Hilversum
Syracuse University faculty
Dutch emigrants to the United States